Michel Lévêque (born 19 July 1933, in Algiers, Algeria)  is a French diplomat and politician. From 1997 to 2000 he was minister of state for Monaco. He was the French ambassador to Libya (1985–1989), Morocco (1991–1993), Brazil (1993–1994) and Algeria (1995–1997).

References

Living people
1933 births
Ministers of State of Monaco
Ambassadors of France to Algeria
Ambassadors of France to Brazil
Ambassadors of France to Libya
Ambassadors of France to Morocco